This is a list of the heritage sites in Free State in South Africa as recognized by the South African Heritage Resource Agency.

|}

References 

Tourist attractions in the Free State (province)
Free State
Heritage states